Ladies Who Do is a 1963 British comedy film directed by C. M. Pennington-Richards and starring Peggy Mount, Robert Morley and Harry H. Corbett.

Plot
Mrs. Cragg (Peggy Mount) works as a charwoman (part-time domestic servant) for retired Colonel Whitforth (Robert Morley) and as a cleaner at an office block in London. It is whilst doing her office cleaning that she retrieves a cigar discarded by financier James Ryder (Harry H. Corbett) as a gift for the Colonel, wrapping it in a scrap of paper. The Colonel discovers that the scrap of paper is actually a telegram containing details about a City takeover bid that has fallen through. He unscrupulously uses this insider information to make £5,000 on the stock exchange, which he offers to share equally with Mrs. Cragg.

Though she does not understand what happened, she is convinced that he has done something wrong, so she goes to inform Ryder. However, before she can, she hears him on the telephone talking about his plan to demolish Pitt Street, evicting her and all her friends, so he can erect an office building. She argues with him, to no avail. He tells her, "If you want anything, you've got to go out and get it ... so long as it's legal." She takes his advice to heart.

Determined to foil Ryder's plan, she recruits three of her friends and neighbours in Pitt Street, fellow 'chars' who clean the offices of other noted financiers, to gather information. They form the company "Ladezudu Ltd" ("Ladies Who Do"), a speculation syndicate headed by Whitforth. All goes well until they invest all of their capital, now £60,000, in an Irish pig producer, only to lose everything when an outbreak of swine fever kills the stock.

Meanwhile, Ryder and his partner Sydney Tait offer the residents of Pitt Street £100 each if they agree to move within a month, with very little success. Ryder desperately needs the office building project to succeed, otherwise he will be wiped out. Aware of Ryder's precarious finances, Tait dissolves their partnership. However, having lost everything, the ladies are unable to put up a fight when Ryder brings his demolition crew in. Then the Colonel brings news: when the pigs were buried, valuable "deposits" were discovered, meaning Ladezudu will recoup much more than their investment. Heartened, Mrs. Cragg organises stiff resistance, which convinces Ryder's investor Strang to withdraw from the project. The Colonel invites Ryder to his office to discuss selling out. There he meets the board of directors, the four charwomen, and realises how they obtained their information. The Colonel invites him to lunch to discuss Ryder joining the board. (After they all leave, an unknown man enters the room and starts going through their waste paper.)

Cast
Peggy Mount as Mrs. Cragg
Robert Morley as The Colonel 
Harry H. Corbett as James Ryder
Miriam Karlin as Mrs. Higgins
Avril Elgar as Emily Parish
Dandy Nichols as Mrs. Merryweather
Jon Pertwee as Sydney Tait
Joan Benham as Miss Pinsent
Ron Moody as Police Inspector 
Cardew Robinson as Police Driver
Nigel Davenport as Mr. Strang
Arthur Howard as Chauffeur
Ernest Clark as Stockbroker
Tristram Jellinek as 2nd Stockbroker
John Laurie as Doctor MacGregor
Graham Stark as Foreman
Brian Rawlinson as Shop Steward
Harry Fowler as Drill Operator
Bruce Wightman as Bulldozer Driver
Margaret Boyd as Mrs. Parish
Arthur Mullard as Mr. Merryweather
Ed Devereaux as Mr. Gubbins
Marianne Stone as Mrs. Gubbins
Raymond Smith as Hydraulic Shovel Driver
Carol White as Sandra
Barbara Mitchell as Rose

Production

Filming
It was shot at Twickenham Studios and on location around London.

Reception
Kinematograph Weekly called the film a "money maker" at the British box office for 1964.

DVD release
Ladies Who Do was released on DVD in the UK on 24 March 2008.

References

External links
 
 

1963 films
1960s business films
1963 comedy films
British comedy films
British black-and-white films
Films directed by C. M. Pennington-Richards
Films scored by Ron Goodwin
Films set in London
Films shot in London
Films shot at Twickenham Film Studios
1960s English-language films
1960s British films